The 2018–19 Liga Leumit was the 20th season as second tier since its re-alignment in 1999 and the 77th season of second-tier football in Israel.

A total of sixteen teams contested in the league, including twelve sides from the 2017–18 season, the two promoted teams from 2017–18 Liga Alef and the two relegated teams from 2017–18 Israeli Premier League.

Changes from 2017–18 season

Team changes
Hapoel Tel Aviv and Hapoel Hadera were promoted to the 2018–19 Israeli Premier League.

Hapoel Ashkelon and Hapoel Acre were relegated after finishing as the two bottom-placed clubs in the 2017–18 Israeli Premier League.

Maccabi Herzliya, and Ironi Nesher were directly relegated to Liga Alef after finishing in the previous season in last two league places. They were replaced the top placed teams from each division of 2017–18 Liga Alef, Sektzia Ness Ziona (from South Division) and Hapoel Iksal (from North Division).

Overview

Stadia and locations

The club is playing their home games at a neutral venue because their own ground does not meet league requirements.

Regular season

Results

Matches 1–30

Playoffs

Promotion playoff

Top Playoff table

Top Playoff results

Relegation playoff

Bottom Playoff table

Bottom Playoff results

Positions by round

Source: IFA
Source:

Promotion/relegation playoff
The 14th-placed team, Hapoel Acre, faced 2018–19 Liga Alef promotion play-offs winner Maccabi Herzliya in a two-legged tie. The matches took place on 26 and 29 May 2019.

Hapoel Acre won 7–4 on aggregate and remained in Liga Leumit. Maccabi Herzliya remained in Liga Alef.

See also
 2018–19 Toto Cup Leumit

References

2018–19 in Israeli football leagues
Liga Leumit seasons
Isr